Nick E. Hysong (born December 9, 1971 in Winslow, Arizona) is an American athlete competing in the men's pole vault. Best known for winning the Olympic gold medal in 2000 with a personal best jump of 5.90 metres, he also won a bronze medal at the 2001 World Championships in Athletics.  Has excellent speed.  He has run 10.27 for 100 meters.

Biography
In his final year at Arizona State University in 1994, he won both the Pac-10 and the NCAA championships. He is now coaching  pole vaulting team at Chaparral High School (Arizona) for the track and field team. Hysong is also running his own sports performance facility in phoenix Arizona(RISEN Performance – linked below). In 2010 under his private coaching Alex Bishop won the 5A1 Arizona State Championship with a vault of 5 meters, and Liz Portenova won the 5A2 State Championship with a vault of 3.70 meters. In 2012 Hysong's RISEN Performance had two exceptional male vaulters: Grant Sisserson pole vaulted 16' and had a 3rd-place finish at The State Championships, and Cole Walsh pole vaulted 16' 5" to win the Arizona Meet of Champion's (Walsh finished 2nd at the State Champs with a vault of 16' 3").

Achievements

External links
 Nick Hysong at USA Track and Field
 
 
 
 Nick Hysong's Training Facility – RISEN Performance

American male pole vaulters
People from Winslow, Arizona
Athletes (track and field) at the 2000 Summer Olympics
Olympic gold medalists for the United States in track and field
1971 births
Living people
World Athletics Championships medalists
Medalists at the 2000 Summer Olympics